Birote Kalan is one of the 51 union councils of Abbottabad District in the Khyber-Pakhtunkhwa province of Pakistan.

Etymology

The name of the union council Birote means "the land of wrestlers". The words khurd and kalan ("little" and "big") are administrative terminology dating back to Mughal times, to differentiate two areas with the same name, hence Birote Khurd means "little khurd". The words khurd ("small") and kalan ("big") are taken from Persian. (cf. Britannia major, "Greater Britain" and Britannia minor "Lesser Britain").

Location 

Birote Kalan is located in the south eastern part of Circle Bakote Region of Abbottabad District and borders the Tehsil Dheerkot of Bagh District of Kashmir in East while Mukeshpuri Top & Ayubia in West. In North Famous Kohala Bridge is Located while in South Murree. Birote was consequently affected by the 2005 Pakistan earthquake as the epicentre was in Kashmir.

Subdivisions
The Union Council is subdivided into the following areas:

Birote Kalan
Birote Khurd
Kahoo Sharqi
Kahoo Gharbi

References

Union councils of Abbottabad District